Sir Frank Thomas Moore AO (born 29 November 1930) is an Australian businessman noted for his long-term promotion of the Australian tourism industry, particularly in Queensland.

Biography
Moore was born in Queensland in 1930 to Francis Edward Moore and Beatrice Moore, nee Leonard (his mother turned 100 in 2011). He first had a career in property valuation and radio broadcasting.  In 1978 he was appointed to head the Queensland Government inquiry that led to the establishment of the Queensland Tourist and Travel Corporation (now Tourism and Events Queensland). He was chair of the Corporation 1978-90, during which time he spearheaded the creation of international airports in Townsville and Cairns.

He was chair of the Australian Tourism Industry Association 1984-96, and also chair of the Australian Tourism Research Institute. He was instrumental in creating the team and the application for Queensland's successful nomination to host World Expo 88 in Brisbane. Moore oversaw the development of the Cooperative Research Centre for Sustainable Tourism and was chair of the Centre 1997-2007. He has also served as chair of the Federal Government's Tourism Forecasting Council, Nature Resorts Limited, Advent Tourism Fund Management Ltd and Great Southern Railway. He was a founding director of Jupiters Limited, a Director of Gold Coast Airport Corporation and a member of the World Travel and Tourism Council.

Honours
Moore was knighted in 1983 for services to tourism. He was appointed an Officer of the Order of Australia (AO) in 1991. He was awarded the Centenary Medal in 2001. In 2008 the University of Queensland awarded him an honorary doctorate.

References

Living people
1930 births
Australian Knights Bachelor
Officers of the Order of Australia
Recipients of the Centenary Medal
Tourism in Queensland
Businesspeople from Queensland
Businesspeople in tourism